Thought: Fordham University Quarterly was a peer-reviewed academic journal that published articles and reviews on a broad range of topics in the Catholic tradition. The journal was established in 1926 at the America Press and moved to Fordham University in 1939, with the first Fordham edition of the journal appearing in March 1940. It continued to be published at Fordham until 1992. The journal's first editor was Francis X. Talbot. During this time the journal published a total of 267 issues containing over 5,000 English-language contributions from well-known philosophers, theologians, social activists, and intellectuals in several countries. The entire collection is available online from the Philosophy Documentation Center.

Notable contributors
 Joseph Bernadin
 Daniel Berrigan
 Dietrich von Hildebrand
 Quentin Lauer
 Bernard Lonergan
 Jacques Maritain
 Thomas Merton
 Walker Percy
 Karl Rahner
 Elizabeth Sewell
 Charles C. Tansill
 Elie Wiesel
 William K. Wimsatt

See also
 List of philosophy journals

References

External links

Comparative Essay Writing Guide

English-language journals
Philosophy journals
Publications established in 1926
Quarterly journals
Catholic studies journals
Philosophy Documentation Center academic journals
Fordham University publications
Publications disestablished in 1992
1992 disestablishments in New York (state)